Mikhail Sergeyevich Tolstykh (19 July 1980 – 8 February 2017), better known by his nom de guerre Givi (Ги́ви), was a Ukrainian separatist officer and accused of war crimes. He was mainly known as the commander of the Donetsk People's Republic's Somalia Battalion of the Separatist Forces in the war in Donbas from 2014, until his death in early 2017.

Biography

In his interview to Komsomolskaya Pravda, Tolstykh said he was from Ilovaisk and served as a conscript in the Ukrainian Army from 1998 to 2000 at a military training center, and wanted to continue in the army as a voluntary soldier after 2000 but was denied due to his speech impediment. He then worked at a sling rope factory and as a security guard in a supermarket. In an interview he stated that his grandfather was an ethnic Georgian; his nickname Givi is Georgian.

Tolstykh joined the rebels in the early stages of the war and was involved in the Battle of Ilovaisk. Givi led the DPR Somalia Battalion in the Second Battle of Donetsk Airport. The Telegraph wrote a brief article about him where he gives interview to Novorossiya TV, during which an explosion took place in close vicinity.

On 16 February 2015, Tolstykh was included by the European Council in their sanctions list. In 2016, he was charged in Ukraine with crimes including the creation of a terrorist organization, abduction, and abuse of prisoners of war.

Treatment of prisoners
In January 2015, several videos surfaced of Tolstykh physically abusing captured Ukrainian artillerymen from the Second Battle of Donetsk Airport. Tolstykh is seen clearly identifying himself before grabbing the prisoners by the face, brandishing a dagger, and cutting off military insignia and forcing prisoners to eat them. Oleksandra Matviychuk, head of the Kyiv-based Center for Civil Liberties, called what appears in the videos "flagrant violations of the Geneva Conventions" and said she was preparing the groundwork for prosecution.

Death
Early in the morning of 8 February 2017, while working in his Donetsk office, Tolstykh was killed by an explosion said to be caused by an RPO-A Shmel rocket launcher fired from an unknown distance. DPR officials accused Ukrainian forces of carrying out the attack, while Ukrainian security officials claimed it to be the result of DPR infighting. In 2022 journalist Yuriy Butusov claimed that Tolstykh was killed by a counter-intelligence unit of the Security Service of Ukraine (SBU) which was approved by then-president Petro Poroshenko.

See also 

 Alexander Bednov
 Valery Bolotov
 Aleksey Mozgovoy
 Arsen Pavlov
  Graham Phillips
 Gennadiy Tsypkalov
 Alexander Zakharchenko
 Separatist forces of the war in Donbas

Notes

References

External links

1980 births
2017 deaths
Male murder victims
People from Ilovaisk
People of the Donetsk People's Republic
People with speech impediment
Pro-Russian people of the war in Donbas
Military personnel killed in the Russo-Ukrainian War
Russian people of Georgian descent
Security guards
Unsolved murders in Ukraine
Russian individuals subject to European Union sanctions
Ukrainian collaborators with Russia
Individuals designated as terrorist by the government of Ukraine
2017 murders in Ukraine